Thiago Luiz Moreira de Araújo (born February 18, 1988), known as Thiago Araújo, is a Brazilian footballer who plays for Camboriú. In 2013 he went with fellow Brazilian player, Marcelina Emerson to play in Romania for Liga I club Viitorul Constanța.

References

External links
Thiago Araújo at playmakerstats.com (English version of ogol.com.br and zerozero.pt)

1988 births
Living people
Footballers from Curitiba
Brazilian footballers
Brazilian expatriate footballers
Paraná Clube players
Clube Atlético Juventus players
J. Malucelli Futebol players
Central Sport Club players
FC Viitorul Constanța players
Liga I players
Expatriate footballers in Romania
Brazilian expatriate sportspeople in Romania
Association football defenders